George William Reginald Victor Coventry, 10th Earl of Coventry (10 September 1900 - 27 May 1940) was the son of George William Coventry, Viscount Deerhurst, and Virginia Daniel. As his father predeceased his grandfather, the 10th Earl was his grandfather's heir to the earldom. George Coventry inherited both the earldom and the viscountcy on 13 March 1930. He was educated at Ludgrove School  and Eton College.

Politics 
Standing as a Unionist, Coventry unsuccessfully stood in  the Carmarthen Constituency in the 1922 General Election.

Military service
Coventry was a Lieutenant in the 7th Battalion, Worcestershire Regiment, which was part of the original Expeditionary Force sent to France in September 1939. His regiment was subsequently evacuated during the retreat from Dunkirk; Coventry was executed on 27 May 1940 at La Bassée, during the Battle of Dunkirk which preceded it. He is buried in the communal cemetery at Givenchy-lès-la-Bassée.

A memorial service was held at Croome Church in Worcester on 21 July 1940.

Family and personal life
He married the Honourable Nesta Donne Philipps in September 1921; they had four children. His youngest child, also named George William Coventry and subsequently 11th Earl of Coventry was born at Croome Court on 25 January 1934. The 10th earl's daughters were Anne Donne, Joan Blanche, and Maria Alice Coventry.

In 1932, he was appointed the Deputy Lieutenant for the county of Worcestershire.

He served as a company director of the London and Thames Haven Oil Wharves Limited.

Coventry enjoyed hunting and was the Master of the Carmarthenshire Hounds, the Hawkstone Hounds as well as the Croome Hounds.

References

1900 births
1940 deaths
Worcestershire Regiment officers
British Army personnel killed in World War II
Earls of Coventry
Conservative Party (UK) parliamentary candidates
Conservative Party (UK) hereditary peers
20th-century English nobility
Military personnel from Worcestershire
Deputy Lieutenants of Worcestershire
People educated at Ludgrove School
Burials in Hauts-de-France